The Ferdinandstein is a prominent rock in the Harz National Park in central Germany

Geography

Location 
The Ferdinandstein lies at an elevation of 648 metres above sea level near Plessenburg in the borough of Wernigerode in the Harz Mountains.

Geology 
The rock is a granite boulder that is a typical product of spheroidal weathering.

History 
The rock is inscribed with the words "Ferdinands Stein". Behind it on a smaller rock embedded in the ground is the inscription "Hier schoss Ferdinand Graf zu Stolberg Wernigerode am 23ten Merz 1798 einen Wolf" ("Here Ferdinand, Count of Stolberg- Wernigerode shot a wolf on 23 March 1798"). This was the last wolf living in the wild that was shot by the Count.

Views and hiking 
The rock is checkpoint no. 16 in the Harzer Wandernadel hiking network.

References

Literature 
 Hahnemann, Marlies (2011). Die Harzer Wandernadel, 2nd ed., Projeckte-Verlag Cornelius, Halle, p. 29. .

Rock formations of the Harz